Man on Pink Corner is a 1962 Argentine film directed by René Múgica, based on the story by Jorge Luis Borges. It was shown at the Cannes and San Sebastián film festivals.

Borges viewed the film favourably, commenting "he did a good job with the possibilities provided by the plot".

In a survey of the 100 greatest films of Argentine cinema carried out by the Museo del Cine Pablo Ducrós Hicken in 2000, the film reached the 17th position. In a new version of the survey organized in 2022 by the specialized magazines La vida útil, Taipei and La tierra quema, presented at the Mar del Plata International Film Festival, the film reached the 48th position.

Cast
 Francisco Petrone - Francisco Real, "El Corralero" 
 Walter Vidarte - El Oriental 
 Susana Campos - La Lujanera 
 Jacinto Herrera - Rosendo Juárez, "El Pegador" 
 Berta Ortegosa - Julia 
 Jorge de la Riestra - Eleodoro, "El Turco" 
 María Esther Podestá - Casera de la pensión 
 María Esther Buschiazzo - Madre de Nicolás Fuentes 
 Mario Savino - Cosme 
 Juan Carlos Galván - Juan 
 Ricardo Argemí - Don Carmelo 
 Alberto Barcel - Comisario 
 Isidro Fernán Valdez - Tío de Nicolás Fuentes 
 Adolfo Linvel - Nicanor 
 Tino Pascali - Intendente 
 Andrés Rivero - Padre de Nicolás Fuentes 
 Claudio Lucero - Agente Medina 
 Manuel Rosón - Ramón Santoro 
 Susana Brunetti - Mujer en pulpería 
 Zulma Grey - Prostituta 
 Aída Villadeamigo - Florista 
 Mercedes Escribano - Vieja 
 Rafael Chumbita 
 Délfor Medina - Comisario 2 
 Rafael Diserio - Carrero 
 Ovidio Fuentes - Puestero 
 Héctor Fuentes - Muchacho en pulpería 
 Reina del Carmen 
 Mariel Comber - Mujer en pulpería

References

External links
 
Hombre de la esquina rosada on "The Garden of Forking Paths" Borges site.

1962 films
1960s Spanish-language films
Argentine black-and-white films
Adaptations of works by Jorge Luis Borges
Argentine crime drama films
Films directed by René Múgica
1960s Argentine films